Iovan is a Romanian surname. Notable people with the surname include:

Kayla Meagan Iovan (born 1990), Canadian singer and actress
Sonia Iovan (born 1935), Romanian artistic gymnast
Ştefan Iovan (born 1960), Romanian footballer and manager

Romanian-language surnames